The Real World: Boston is the sixth season of MTV's reality television series The Real World, which focuses on a group of diverse strangers living together for several months in a different city each season, as cameras follow their lives and interpersonal relationships. It is the only season of The Real World to be filmed in the New England region of the United States, specifically in Massachusetts.

The season featured seven people who lived in a converted historic firehouse at 127 Mt. Vernon Street, Boston, Massachusetts, which is located right off of Charles Street and was also used in the television series Spenser: For Hire. The season premiered on July 15, 1997 and consisted of 23 episodes.

Assignment
Almost every season of The Real World, beginning with its fifth season, has included the assignment of a season-long group job or task to the housemates. The Boston cast worked with children at an after-school program in East Boston. Some of the cast worry they will not get along with youngsters or like the job, but in the end they all enjoy it. Montana, however, was fired from the job as a result of allegations involving alcohol and has to find another way to volunteer, since she is required to volunteer for 20 hours a week by contract while she is in Boston. Kameelah and Elka also get into trouble for an argument they have, within earshot of the children, stemming from Kameelah's anger towards Elka for discussing what she believes was a sexual interlude that Kameelah had at the house. At the end of the season, Syrus becomes emotional when he talks about how he will miss the children.

The residence
The cast lived in a  converted firehouse at 127 Mt. Vernon Street in Beacon Hill, a 19th-century downtown Boston residential neighborhood. During filming, the Firehouse, which originally housed the Safety Inspectors for the Boston Fire Department, featured two double bedrooms and one triple bedroom. The Control Room was located in the basement. The Firehouse had previously been seen as the home of Spenser on the 1980s TV series Spenser: For Hire. It is currently occupied by Hill House, a non-profit community center.

Cast

: Age at the time of filming.

Episodes

This was the first season where a special preshow episode was also aired, documenting the months-long casting process.

After filming
At the 2008 The Real World Awards Bash, Jason received a nomination in the "Hottest Male" category, Montana was in the running for "Best Phonecall Gone Bad", and Syrus for "Biggest Playa".

After meeting her on Road Rules: All Stars, Sean Duffy married Rachel Campos of The Real World: San Francisco, with whom he has nine children. He became district attorney for Ashland County, Wisconsin, and was elected to Congress in 2010. Due to their ninth baby's anticipated health complications, Duffy announced that he was resigning from Congress, in order to focus his time and attention on his family.

Syrus Yarbrough was featured in Eminem's video for "Without Me" in 2002 along with other Real World alumni Julie Stoffer and David "Puck" Rainey. He also appeared in the international film, Reservation.

Montana became as an acupuncturist working in Encino, California.

The Challenge
This is the first season of The Real World whose entire cast has at one time or another competed in MTV's spin-off reality series The Real World/Road Rules Challenge.

Bold indicates the contestant was a finalist on The Challenge.

References

External links
The Real World: Boston at mtv.com
The Real World Houses: Boston
The Real World: Boston at the Internet Movie Database

Boston
Television shows set in Boston
1997 American television seasons
1997 in Boston
Television shows filmed in Boston